Sidney Godolphin is the name of:
 Sidney Godolphin (colonel) (1652–1732), Member of Parliament for fifty years
 Sidney Godolphin (poet) (1610–1643), English poet
 Sidney Godolphin, 1st Earl of Godolphin (c. 1640–1712), leading British politician, MP for Helston in Cornwall 1665–Feb 1679, Sept 1679–1685
Sidney Godolphin Alexander Shippard (1838–1902), British colonial administrator